Laure Murat (born 1967, Paris) is a French historian and writer.

Biography 
A member of the House of Murat, Laure Murat is a cousin of the 8th Prince Murat, and the daughter of Napoleon Murat, producer of films, and Ines of Albert de Luynes, who wrote some books.

An autodidact, she passed her doctorate (in history at the École des hautes études en sciences sociales) in 2006 only. Her field of study extends to the history of culture, history of psychiatry, and gender studies.

As of 2016, she is a professor at the Department of French and Francophone Studies of the University of California, Los Angeles (UCLA).

In 2012, she was granted a Guggenheim Fellowships.

Works 
1992: Palais de la nation, phot. de Georges Fessy, Flammarion, 256 p. 
1996: Paris des écrivains, (dir.), Paris, Éditions du Chêne, series "Paris", 192 p. 
1998: L'expédition d'Égypte : le rêve oriental de Bonaparte, with Nicolas Weill, Éditions Gallimard, series "Découvertes Gallimard" vol. 343, 160 p. 
2001: La Maison du docteur Blanche : histoire d’un asile et de ses pensionnaires, de Nerval à Maupassant, Éditions J.-C. Lattès, 424 p. 
- Prix Goncourt de la biographie 2001
- Prix de la Critique de l'Académie française 2001
2003: Passage de l’Odéon : Sylvia Beach, Adrienne Monnier et la vie littéraire à Paris dans l’entre-deux-guerres, éditions Fayard, series "Histoire de la pensée", 368 p. 
2005: "Proust, Marcel, 46 ans, rentier" in La Revue littéraire, n° 14, 
2006: La loi du genre : une histoire culturelle du troisième sexe, Fayard, series "Histoire de la pensée", 464 p. 
2011: L'homme qui se prenait pour Napoléon : pour une histoire politique de la folie, Gallimard, series "Hors Série Connaissance", 382 p. 
 - Prix Femina essai 2011
2015: Relire : enquête sur une passion littéraire, Paris, Éditions Flammarion, series "Essais littéraires", 304 p. 
2015: Flaubert à la Motte-Picquet, Flammarion, series "Essais littéraires", 96 p. 
2016: Ceci n'est pas une ville, Flammarion, series "Essais littéraires"
under the pseudonym Iris Castor
2010: Iris Castor et Zrinka Stahuljak, Zoé, la nuit, Paris, Éditions J.-C. Lattès, series "Thrillers", 240 p.

References

External links 
 Los Angeles défait vos préjugés on L'Humanité
 Laure Murat, avec "Ceci n'est pas une ville" on France Inter 
 Laure Murat on France Culture
 
 

1967 births
Writers from Paris
Living people
20th-century French historians
French women historians
21st-century French historians
French medical historians
Cultural historians
20th-century French writers
21st-century French writers
School for Advanced Studies in the Social Sciences alumni
University of California, Los Angeles faculty
Prix Femina essai winners
Prix Goncourt de la Biographie winners
21st-century French women writers
20th-century French women writers